Konig is an unincorporated community and populated place in Horry County, South Carolina, United States. It is located near the intersections of US Route 17 & US Route 501 in Myrtle Beach.

Geography

Konig is located at latitude 33.712 and longitude -78.922 at an elevation of 23 feet.

References

External links

Unincorporated communities in Horry County, South Carolina
Unincorporated communities in South Carolina